John D. Lowry  was an American professional baseball player who played for the Washington Nationals in 1875.  He appeared in six games for the Nationals and hit .136.

External links

Washington Nationals (NA) players
19th-century baseball players
Baseball players from Baltimore
Date of birth missing
Date of death missing